Urazbakhty (Uraźbaqtı) is a rural locality (a village) in Karaidelsky Selsoviet, Karaidelsky District, Bashkortostan, Russia. The population was 101 as of 2010. There are 6 streets.

Geography 
Urazbakhty is located 14 km northeast of Karaidel (the district's administrative centre) by road. Nizhniye Balmazy is the nearest rural locality.

References 

Rural localities in Karaidelsky District